AHRC New York City is an organization serving people with intellectual and developmental disabilities in New York City. The initialism AHRC once stood for Association for the Help of Retarded Children. While the name is no longer used, the organization retained its four letters.

History
AHRC New York City was founded in 1949 by Ann Greenberg and other parents of children with intellectual disabilities, who found the services available to their child inadequate.

In 1954, AHRC New York City established the first sheltered workshop in the United States.

See also 
 NYSARC

References

External links 
 Official website

Non-profit organizations based in New York City
Disability organizations based in the United States